A poison pen letter is a letter or note containing unpleasant, abusive, or malicious statements or accusations about the recipient or a third party. It is usually sent anonymously. In the term "poison pen" (or poisoned pen), the word poison is used figuratively, rather than literally. Poison pen letters are usually composed and sent to upset the recipient. They differ from blackmail, which is intended to obtain something from the recipient.

In the United Kingdom, Section 1 of the Malicious Communications Act 1988 covers most cases of poison pen letters.

See also
 Ransom note effect – A message composed of multiple juxtaposing typefaces
 James Forster (poison pen letter writer)
 Hate mail
 Chain letter
 Stalking

References

Letters (message)
Abuse
Bullying